The Byzantine economy was among the most robust economies in the Mediterranean for many centuries. Constantinople was a prime hub in a trading network that at various times extended across nearly all of Eurasia and North Africa. Some scholars argue that, up until the arrival of the Arabs in the 7th century, the Eastern Roman Empire had the most powerful economy in the world. The Arab conquests, however, would represent a substantial reversal of fortunes contributing to a period of decline and stagnation. Constantine V's reforms (c. 765) marked the beginning of a revival that continued until 1204. From the 10th century until the end of the 12th, the Byzantine Empire projected an image of luxury, and the travelers were impressed by the wealth accumulated in the capital. All this changed with the arrival of the Fourth Crusade, which was an economic catastrophe. The Palaiologoi tried to revive the economy, but the late Byzantine state would not gain full control of either the foreign or domestic economic forces.

One of the economic foundations of the empire was trade. The state strictly controlled both the internal and the international trade, and retained the monopoly of issuing coinage. Constantinople remained the single most important commercial centre of Europe for much of the Medieval era, which it held until the Republic of Venice slowly began to overtake Byzantine merchants in trade; first through tax exemption under the Komnenoi, then under the Latin Empire.

Agriculture

From 4th to end of 6th century the eastern part of Roman Empire had demographic, economic and agricultural expansion. The climate was opportune for farming. Even in marginal regions rural settlements flourished.

Development in the rural economy, though certainly slow, was continuous from the 8th to the beginning of the 14th century. Areas close to the sea featuring cereal crops, vines, and olive groves (the interior of the Balkans, and Asia Minor concentrated on stock raising) were relatively well-favored, and appear to have played an important role in the development of the Byzantine economy.  The peasantry's tools changed little through the ages, and remained rudimentary, which resulted in a low ratio of productivity to labor. Nevertheless, according to certain scholars, the permanence of techniques, and tools are evidence of their successful adaptation to the environment.

From the 7th to the 12th century, the social organization of production was arranged round two poles: estate and village (a collection of free smallholders). The village social structure was the organizational form best adapted to insecure conditions, with the estate fulfilling this role once conditions were safe again. There was in principle a clear distinction between tenants who lived on the estates (and owed dues to the master of the place), and the village inhabitants, many of whom owned land, and consequently paid taxes to the state. Nevertheless, not all the cultivators on the estate lived there, and not all enjoyed a special status. Some of them were slaves and some were wage laborers; references to wage laborers occur continuously from the 7th century to the end of the Byzantine period. In the same way, the inhabitants of a village would not all be landholders, and of these, not all would be farmers; some village proprietors held the lowest rank of aristocrat status, and were wealthier than tenant farmers. The distinction between landholder and tenant farmer (paroikos) was weakened once tenures held by paroikoi were considered hereditary, and once some paroikoi achieved owner status. From the 10th century on, large estates assumed the leading role that had been held until then by villages, albeit in an economy that was henceforth orientated toward demand, with monetary exchanges taking a larger share. By the beginning of the 14th century, the Macedonian countryside was made up of an almost unbroken network of estates that had replaced the former network of communes. Villages that are known to have possessed commune status in the 10th century became estates of the fisc, after which they might be ceded to a monastery or lay person.

The population was dense in the 6th century, but it diminished in the 7th and 8th centuries. Epidemics (such as the plague of 541/542 and its recurrences until 747) seem to have had greater effects on population volume than wars. From the 9th century on, the population of the empire increased, but it was unevenly distributed. A growing population would imply an increase in the area under cultivation. The automatic effect of a larger population was also amplified by the demand from a growing number of people who did not produce much or at all. Indeed, it is estimated that areas under cultivation must have almost doubled, and that the extension of crops might have affected a shift in the location of grazing lands, and pushed back the woodlands.

The 12th century saw the development of tilling and milling technologies in the West, but there is less evidence for similar Byzantine innovation. Western advances like the windmill were adopted by the Byzantines, but, unlike the West, Arabic numerals were not yet implemented for double-entry book-keeping. There are illustrations of agricultural implements from illuminated medieval manuscripts of Hesiod's Works and Days including the wheel, mortar, pestle, mallet and some parts for carts and soleard plough, but, even centuries later, neither the plough nor wheeled cart were widely in use, possibly because of the nature of the Pontic terrain.

The conquest of the empire by the Crusaders in 1204, and the subsequent division of the Byzantine territories affected the agrarian economy as it did other aspects of economic organization, and economic life. These territories split among small Greek and Latin states, lost much of the cohesion they may have had: the Byzantine state could not function as a unifying force, and, in the 13th century, there was very little to replace it. The 13th century is the last period, during which one may speak of significant land clearance, that is, the act of bringing previously uncultivated land into cultivation. But the progressive impoverishment of the peasantry, entailed the decline of a certain aggregate demand, and resulted in a concentration of resources in the hands of large landowners, who must have had considerable surpluses.

The demographic expansion came to an end in the course of the 14th century, during which a deterioration of the status of paroikoi, an erosion of the economic function of village by the role of the large estates, and a precipitous demographic decline in Macedonia is established by modern research. The upper levels of the aristocracy lost their fortunes, and eventually there was a concentration of property on the hands of the larger, and more privileged monasteries, at least in Macedonia. The monasteries did not show great versatility or innovative spirit, and the rural economy had to wait, for its recovery, until the effects of epidemics had been reversed, security had been established, and communications restored: that is, until the firm establishment of the Ottomans in the Balkans.

Economic and fiscal history
The Eastern Roman economy suffered less from the Barbarian raids that plagued the Western Roman Empire. Under Diocletian's reign, the Eastern Roman Empire's annual revenue was at 9,400,000 solidi, out of a total of 18,000,000 solidi for the entire Roman Empire. These estimates can be compared to the AD 150 annual revenue of 14,500,000 solidi and the AD 215 of 22,000,000 solidi. By the end of Marcian's reign, the annual revenue for the Eastern empire was 7,800,000 solidi, thus allowing him to amass about 100,000 pounds/45 tonnes of gold or 7,200,000 solidi for the imperial treasury. Warren Treadgold estimates that during the period from Diocletian to Marcian, the Eastern Empire's population and agriculture declined a bit, but not much. Actually, the few preserved figures show that the largest eastern cities grew somewhat between the 3rd and 5th centuries. By Marcian's reign the Eastern Empire's difficulties seem to have been easing, and the population had probably begun growing for the first time in centuries.

The wealth of Constantinople can be seen by how Justin I used  pounds/1.66 tonnes of gold just for celebrating his own consulship. By the end of his reign, Anastasius I had managed to collect for the treasury an amount of 23,000,000 solidi or 320,000 pounds/144 tonnes of gold. At the start of Justinian I's reign, the Emperor had inherited a surplus   from Anastasius I and Justin I. Before Justinian I's reconquests the state had an annual revenue of  solidi, which further increased after his reconquests in 550. Nevertheless, Justinian I had little money left towards the end of his reign partly because of the Justinian Plague, and the Roman–Persian Wars (Justinian spent large amounts of money in annual subsidies to the Sassanian Empire), as well as his wars of reconquest in Italy and North Africa, all of which greatly strained the royal treasury. In addition to these expenses, the rebuilding of Hagia Sophia cost  pounds/9 tonnes of gold. Subsidies to enemy states were also paid by Justinian's successors: Justin II was forced to pay 80,000 silver coins to the Avars for peace; his wife Sophia  paid 45,000 solidi to Khosrau I in return for a year's truce, and then Tiberius II Constantine gave away  pounds of gold each year for four years. The East Roman Empire's aristocratic language of Latin began to erode and give way to the native language of Greek starting during the Roman-Persian Great War of 602-628, the solidus (plural: solidi) would begin to also be known by its Greek name, the nomisma (plural: nomismata).

The Byzantine-Arab Wars reduced the territory of the Empire to a third in the 7th century and the economy slumped; in 780 the Byzantine Empire's revenues were reduced to only  nomismata. From the 8th century onward the Empire's economy improved dramatically. This was a blessing for Byzantium in more than one way; the economy, the administration of gold coinage and the farming of the Anatolian peninsula served to meet the military's constant demands. Since Byzantium was in a constant state of warfare with her neighbours (even if only by raiding) the military required weapons to be manufactured by the bigger cities (such as Thessaloniki) whilst the smaller towns were subject to grain, wine and even biscuit requisitions by Imperial officers. Even though the soldiers' pay was minimal, large armies were a considerable strain on Byzantium. As gold coins were spent on soldiers to serve in the army, these would in time spend their money acquiring their own goods and much revenue would return to the state in the form of taxation. As a result, the Byzantine economy was self-sufficient, allowing it to thrive in the Dark Ages. The success of the Byzantine army was in no small part due to the success of her economy.

Around 775, the land and head taxes yielded an estimated 1,600,000 nomismata/7.2 tonnes of gold annually for the empire. Commerce during this period slumped, therefore only contributing 200,000 nomismata annually. The expenditures of the period were quite large when compared to the annual revenues. Approximately 600,000 nomismata went to the payroll of the army annually while other military costs took another 600,000 nomismata annually. Supporting the Byzantine bureaucracy needed 400,000 nomismata. Also, imperial largess cost the treasury 100,000 nomismata every year. All of these expenses meant that the Byzantine government had only about 100,000 nomismata in surplus revenue each year for treaties, bribes, or gifts.

Expenses again soared, when a massive Muslim army invaded the empire in 806, forcing Nikephoros I to pay a ransom of  gold coins and a yearly tribute of  gold coins. In order to impress the Caliph of Baghdad, Theophilos distributed 36,000 gold coins to the citizens of Baghdad, and in 838, he was forced to pay  gold dinars to the Caliph. The Byzantine economic recovery in the early 9th century can be seen by the fact that Emperor Theophilos was able to leave 7,000,000 nomismata/31.5 tonnes of gold in the imperial treasury for his successor in 842. After Theophilos' death his wife Theodora II continued his successful policies and even increased the imperial reserves to 7,848,000 nomismata.

Around 850, the land and head taxes yielded an estimated 2,900,000 nomismata annually for the empire. Commerce during this period increased dramatically, therefore contributing 400,000 nomismata annually. The expenditures of the period were large, but manageable by the treasury. Approximately 1,400,000 nomismata went to the payroll of the army annually while other military costs took another 800,000 nomismata annually. Supporting the Byzantine bureaucracy needed 500,000 nomismata. Also, imperial largess cost the treasury 100,000 nomismata every year. All of these expenses meant that the Byzantine government had about 500,000 nomismata in surplus revenue each year, much more than in the 8th century.

Unfortunately under their son Michael III the reserves dwindled to about 100,000 nomismata. However, under Basil I's prudent economic policies, the state quickly raised 4,300,000 nomismata, far more even than the empire's annual revenue of  nomismata.

From the 10th century, however, until the end of the twelfth, the Byzantine Empire projected an image of wealth and luxury. Constantine V's reforms (c. 765) marked the beginning of a revival that continued until 1204. The travelers who visited its capital were impressed by the wealth accumulated in Constantinople; riches that also served the state's diplomatic purposes as a means of propaganda, and a way to impress foreigners as well its own citizens. When Liutprand of Cremona was sent as an ambassador to the Byzantine capital in the 940s, he was overwhelmed by the imperial residence, the luxurious meals, and acrobatic entertainment.

Sviatoslav I was paid  pounds of gold by Nikephoros II to invade Bulgaria in 968. By the time of Basil II's death in 1025, the annual income had increased to  nomismata, which allowed him to amass a large surplus of 14,400,000 nomismata (200,000 pounds/90 tonnes of gold) in the treasury for his successor.

Nevertheless, the Byzantine economy went into a long decline until the Comnenian Dynasty was able to revive the economy.  In the aftermath of the Battle of Manzikert, Alp Arslan at first suggested to Emperor Romanos IV a ransom of  gold coins, but later reduced it to  gold coins with a further  gold coins annually.

In exchange for an alliance, Alexios I sent  gold coins to Emperor Henry IV. The wealth of the empire under the Comnenians can be seen by how Emperor Manuel I was able to ransom some Latin prisoners from the Muslims for  dinars, then  dinars for Bohemond III in 1165,  dinars for Raynald of Châtillon, and  dinars for Baldwin of Ibelin in 1180. When Manuel became emperor he ordered 2 gold coins to be given to every householder in Constantinople and 200 pounds of gold (including 200 silver coins annually) to be given to the Eastern Orthodox Church. When his niece Theodora married King Baldwin III of Jerusalem in 1157, Manuel gave her a dowry of  gold coins,  gold coins for marriage expenses, and presents (jewels and silk garments) which were worth  gold coins total. The expense of Manuel's involvement in Italy must have cost the treasury a great deal (probably more than 2,160,000 hyperpyra or  pounds of gold). Then he also promised to pay  pounds of gold to the Pope and the Curia. During his reign, Manuel bought a very rich jewel (for  silver marks) which was used during the coronation of the Latin Emperor Baldwin I. The main source of the state's wealth in the 12th century was the kommerkion, a customs duty levied at Constantinople on all imports and exports, which was stated to have collected  hyperpyra each day. This, combined with other sources of income, meant the empire's annual revenue was at 5,600,000 hyperpyra in 1150. Under the Komnenian emperors, many exemptions of trade duties were given to the Italian traders, which meant the loss of about 50,000 hyperpyra annually. A Venetian embassy visited Constantinople in 1184 and an agreement was reached that compensation of 1,500 pounds of gold (or 108,000 hyperpyra) would be paid for the losses incurred in 1171. By the end of Manuel I's reign the amount of money used to maintain the Komnenian imperial family is said to be able to maintain an army of 100,000 men.

After the demise of the Komnenoi, the Byzantine economy declined under the impact of several factors: the dismemberment of the Empire after 1204, the successive territorial losses to the Turks (although the strong economic interaction of Byzantine territories with those lost by the Empire continued), and the Italian expansion in the Mediterranean and the Black Sea.  When Isaac II Angelos became Emperor in 1185, a mob broke into the palace and carried off  pounds of gold,  pounds of silver, and 20,000 pounds of bronze coins. In 1195, Holy Roman Emperor Henry VI forced Byzantine Emperor Alexios III Angelos to pay him a tribute of  pounds of gold (originally  pounds of gold) and in 1204 Alexios III took  pounds of gold (or 72,000 hyperpyra) when he fled Constantinople. The presence of the crusading army not only culminated in a violent sack that dispersed and destroyed the accumulated wealth, and culture of centuries, but was accompanied by a series of fires that ravaged the northern and central sections of the city resulting in a steady exodus of the city's residents to the Greek centers of government in exile. The sack of Constantinople by Latin crusaders in 1204 was an economic catastrophe. Due to the financial crisis, the state could only pay  silver marks ( pounds of pure silver) out of  silver marks (equivalent to 800,000 hyperpyra) to the Crusaders in 1204. The official tally of plunder from Constantinople was about  silver marks, the equivalent of about 3,600,000 hyperpyra or 50,000 pounds/22.5 tonnes of gold. The impoverished Latin emperors melted down statues for coin, while the Venetians exported their declining profits, along with choice relics and architecture spolia for their churches. In 1237, Latin Emperor Baldwin II pawned the Crown of Thorns to a Venetian merchant for  gold coins.

By the time the Palaiologoi took power, Italian merchants had come to dominate the trade by sea whilst Turkic incursions prevented any success from trade across roads. Michael VIII Palaiologos strove to restore the capital's greatness, but the resources of the empire were inadequate. In 1282, Michael VIII was forced to drain the treasury to pay the enormous bribe of  hyperpyra to King Peter III of Aragon to invade the Kingdom of Sicily. Constantinople became once more, as in the seventh and eighth centuries, a ruralized network of scattered nuclei; in the final decades before the fall, the population numbered  people. Gradually, the state also lost its influence on the modalities of trade and the price mechanisms, and its control over the outflow of precious metals and, according to some scholars, even over the minting of coins. By 1303, the empire's annual revenue dropped to less than 1,800,000 hyperpyra, under Andronikos II Palaiologos. In 1321, only with extreme effort was Andonikos II able to raise revenues to 1,000,000 hyperpyra.

The Byzantine economy had declined so much that by 1343, Empress Anna of Savoy had to pawn the Byzantine crown jewels for  Venetian ducats, which was the equivalent of 60,000 hyperpyra. In 1348, Constantinople had an annual revenue of  hyperpyra while across the Golden Horn in the Genoese colony of Galata, the annual revenue was  hyperpyra. When Emperor John VI Kantakouzenos attempted to rebuild the Byzantine navy, he was only able to raise an inadequate  hyperpyra. The only success during this period was when the Republic of Genoa agreed to pay a war indemnity of  hyperpyra in 1349. When Emperor John V Palaiologos was captured by Ivan Alexander in 1366, he was forced to pay a ransom of  florins. In 1370, the empire owed Venice,  hyperpyra (of which only  hyperpyra had so far been paid) for damage done to Venetian property. In February 1424, Manuel II Palaiologos signed an unfavorable peace treaty with the Ottoman Turks, whereby the Byzantine Empire was forced to pay  silver coins to the Sultan on annual basis. In 1453, the economy of the Genoan quarter in Constantinople had a revenue 7 times greater than that of the whole Empire — not even a shadow of its former self. Emperor Constantine XI owed Venice 17,163 hyperpyra when he died in 1453.

The exact amount of annual income the Byzantine government received, is a matter of considerable debate, due to the scantness and ambiguous nature of the primary sources. The following table contains approximate estimates.

State's role

The state retained the monopoly of issuing coinage, and had the power to intervene in other important sectors of the economy. It exercised formal control over interest rates, and set the parameters for the activity of the guilds and corporations in Constantinople, in which the state has a special interest (e.g. the sale of silk) or whose members exercised a profession that was of importance for trade. The emperor and his officials intervened at times of crisis to ensure the provisioning of the capital and to keep down the price of cereals. For this reason, the empire strictly controlled both the internal circulation of commodities, and the international trade (certainly in intent; to a considerable degree also in practice).<ref name="Helios">Laiou, Writing the Economic History of Byzantium, 3; Zakythinos, The Character of the Economy, 255-256</ref> Additionally, the state often collected part of the surplus in the form of tax, and put it back into circulation, through redistribution in the form of salaries to state officials of the army, or in the form of investment in public works, buildings, or works of art.

Coinage

Coinage was the basic form of money in Byzantium, although credit existed: archival documents indicate that both banking and bankers were not as primitive as has sometimes been implied. The Byzantine Empire was capable of making a durable monetary system function for more than a thousand years, from Constantine I to 1453, because of its relative flexibility. Money was both product and instrument of a complex and developed financial and fiscal organization that contributed to the economic integration of its territory.

The first features of the administrative organization of monetary production were first established by Diocletian and Constantine, and were still in existence at the beginning of the 7th century. During Byzantine history, supervision of the mints belonged to the Emperor; thus the government controlled, to a certain degree, the money supply. Nevertheless, the Emperor and his government were not always capable of conducting a monetary policy in the modern meaning of the term.

Ever since the creation of the Byzantine monetary system by Constantine in 312, its pivot had been golden solidus, a coinage whose nominal value was equal to its intrinsic value, as is proven by the Theodosian Code. Solidus became a highly priced and stable means of storing and transferring values Novel 16 of Valentinian III punished with death anyone who dared "refuse or reduce a gold solidus of good weight." Weight and fineness of the coinage were joined by another element: the authenticity of the stamp, which served to guarantee the other two. Alongside this "real"-value gold coinage, and a slightly overvalued silver coinage, there was also a bronze coinage of a fiduciary nature that made up the second specific feature of the monetary system. At the end of the 10th and in the 11th centuries, money underwent a profound transformation, followed by a crisis; the denomination affected all metals at different dates, and according to different modalities. The reform of Alexios I Komnenos put an end to this crisis by restoring  a gold coinage of high fineness, the hyperpyron, and by creating a new system destined to endure for about two centuries.

In 1304 the introduction of the basilikon, a pure silver coinage modeled on the Venetian ducat marked the abandonment of Komnenian structures under the influence of western models. The system that began in 1367 was constructed around the stavraton, a heavy silver, equivalent to twice the weight of fine metal of the last hyperpyra. By the end of the 12th century, especially from 1204 on, the political fragmentation of the empire resulted in the creation of coinages that were either "national" (e.g. in Trebizond in 1222, in Bulgaria in 1218, and in Serbia in 1228), colonial or feudal. Venetian coins soon penetrated the monetary circulation in Byzantium. This situation stands in contrast with the monopoly that Byzantine currency had enjoyed until the 12th century, within its own frontiers, and through its diffusion in the lands beyond — a measure of its political and economic influence.

Trade

One of the economic foundations of the empire was trade. Constantinople was located on important east-west and north-south trade routes. Trebizond was an important port in the eastern trade.  The exact routes varied over the years with wars and the political situation.  Imports and exports were uniformly taxed at ten percent.

Grain and silk were two of the most important commodities for the empire. The Arab invasion of Egypt and Syria harmed the Byzantium's trade, and affected the provisioning of the capital with grain. As the population increased in the 9th and 10th centuries, the demand for grain also increased. There was a functioning market for grain in Constantinople, but it was not entirely self-regulating: the state could play a role in the availability of grain, and the formation of prices.

Silk was used by the state both as a means of payment, and of diplomacy. Raw silk was bought from China and made up into fine brocades and cloth-of-gold that commanded high prices through the world. Later, silk worms were smuggled into the empire and the overland silk trade became less important. After Justinian I the manufacturing and sale of silk had become an imperial monopoly, only processed in imperial factories, and sold to authorized buyers. The raw silk merchants could buy the raw silk from outside Constantinople but did not themselves have the authority to travel outside the city to get it — possibly in order not to jeopardize the activities of the provincial merchants selling the silk.

The other commodities that were traded, in Constantinople and elsewhere, were numerous: oil, wine, salt, fish, meat, vegetables, other alimentary products, timber and wax. Ceramics, linen, and woven cloth were also items of trade. Luxury items, such as silks, perfumes and spices were also important. Trade in slaves is attested, both on behalf of the state, and, possibly, by private individuals. International trade was practiced not only in Constantinople, which was until the late 12th century an important center of the eastern luxury trade, but also in other cities that functioned as centers of inter-regional and international trade, such as Thessaloniki and Trebizond. Textiles must have been by far the most important item of export; silks were certainly imported into Egypt, and they also appear in Bulgaria and the West. The empire had also trading activity through Venice (as long as the latter was part of the empire): salt, wood, iron, and slaves, as well luxury products from the East, were the products exchanged. In 992, Basil II concluded a treaty with Pietro Orseolo II by the terms that Venice's custom duties in Constantinople would be reduced from 30 nomismata to 17 nomismata in return for the Venetians agreeing to transport Byzantine troops to Southern Italy in times of war. During the 11th and 12th centuries Italian trade in the empire took place under privileged conditions, incorporated in treaties and privileges that were granted to Amalfi, Venice, Genoa, and Pisa.

The Fourth Crusade and the Venetian domination of trade in the area created new conditions. In 1261, the Genoese were given generous customs privileges, and six years later the Venetians regained their original quarter in Constantinople. The two northern Italian trading powers created the conditions that allowed them to reach any point in Byzantium, and to put the entire economic region in the service of their commercial interests.

The Palaiologoi tried to revive the economy, and re-establish traditional forms of political supervision, and guidance of the economy. It was, however, apparent that the late Byzantine state was unable to gain full control of either the foreign or domestic economic forces. Gradually, the state lost its influence on the modalities of trade and the price mechanisms, and its control over the outflow of precious metals and, according to some scholars, even over the minting of coins. Late Byzantine officials supposed to implement a regulatory policy used the state prerogatives placed into their hands to pursue their private businesses. Private commercial activity was also affected by the crises in foreign policy, and the internal erosion of Byzantium.

GDP
The Byzantine GDP per capita has been estimated by the World Bank economist Branko Milanovic to range from $680 to $770 in 1990 International Dollars at its peak around 1000 (reign of Basil II). This corresponds to a range of $ to $ in today's dollars. The Byzantine population size at the time is estimated to have been between 12 and 18 million. This would yield a total GDP somewhere between $ and $ billion in today's terms.

See also
Roman economy

Citations and notes

References

Milanovic, Branko (2006): "An Estimate of Average Income and Inequality in Byzantium around Year 1000", Review of Income and Wealth'', Vol. 52, No. 3, pp. 449–470